Ainhoa Lameiro (born 21 September 2000) is a Spanish slalom canoeist who has competed at the international level since 2016.

She won a silver medal in the C1 team event at the 2019 ICF Canoe Slalom World Championships in La Seu d'Urgell.

References

External links

Living people
Spanish female canoeists
2000 births
Medalists at the ICF Canoe Slalom World Championships
21st-century Spanish women